This is a list of television programmes that are either currently being broadcast or have previously been broadcast on SBS Television's SBS (formerly SBS ONE), SBS Viceland (formerly SBS TWO/SBS2), SBS Food, NITV or SBS WorldWatch in Australia.

Current programming

Domestic

News and current affairs
 Big Mob Brekky (2020–present on NITV)
 Dateline (1984–present)
 The Feed (2013–2019 on SBS VICELAND, 2020–2022 on SBS)
 Insight (1995–present)
 NITV News (2008–present on NITV)
 Living Black (2003–present)
 The Point (2016–present on NITV)
 SBS Arabic News (2022–present on SBS WorldWatch)
 SBS Mandarin News (2022–present on SBS WorldWatch)
 SBS World News (1980–present)
 SBS World Watch (1993–present on SBS and SBS VICELAND)

Drama
 The Hunting (2019)
 New Gold Mountain (2021)
 The Tailings (2021)
 True Colours (2022–present)
 The Unusual Suspects (2021)

Comedy
 Iggy and Ace (2021)
 The Last Year of Television (2020–present)

Reality
 Family Rules (2017–present on NITV)

Factual/Documentaries
 Australia Uncovered (2021–present)
 Australia in Colour (2019–present)
 Australia's Health Revolution with Dr. Michael Mosley (2021–present)
 The Australian Wars (2022–present)
 Every Family Has A Secret (2019–present)
 Going Places with Ernie Dingo (2017–present on NITV)
 Great Australian Railway Journeys (2020–present)
 History Bites Back (2021–present on NITV)
 Inside Central Station (2021–present)
 Lost for Words (2021–present)
 Marry Me, Marry My Family (2018–present)
 Medicine or Myth? (2019–present)
 Stutter School (2021–present)
 The Swiping Game (2020–present)
 What Does Australia Really Think About? (2021–present)
 Who Do You Think You Are? (2008–present)
 Where Are You Really From? (2019–present)

Lifestyle
 Adam and Poh's Malaysia in Australia (2021–present)
 A Middle East Feast with Shane Delia (2021–present)
 The Cook Up with Adam Liaw (2021–present)
 Destination Flavour (2012–present)
 Australia's Food Bowl with Stefano De Pieri (2021–present)
 Asia Unplated with Diana Chan (2019–present)
 Chef Out West (2021–present)
 Food Safari (2006–present)
 Gourmet Farmer (2010–present)
 India Unplated (2021–present)
 Plat du Tour (2020–present)
 Small Business Secrets (2016–present)
 Strait to the Plate (2021–present on NITV)

Game Shows
 Celebrity Letters and Numbers (2021–present)
 Celebrity Mastermind (2020–present)
 Mastermind (2019–present)
 Patriot Brains (2021–present)

Sport Talk
 Cycling Central (2003-2007, 2010–present)
 The Marngrook Footy Show (2007-2010 on NITV and C31 Melbourne, NITV only in early 2011, moved to ABC2 2011-2012, return to NITV 2013–present)
 SBS Speedweek (1995–present)
 The World Game (2001–present)

Sports

 Futsal: UEFA Futsal Champions League (2019–present)
 Rugby league: Indigenous All Stars (2016–present on NITV)
 Soccer: UEFA Women's Champions League (2019–present)

Licensed from beIN Sports:

 Soccer: International Champions Cup (2019–present)

Licensed from Fox Sports:

Cycling: Tour de France (1980–present)

Licensed from Optus Sport:

Soccer: FIFA World Cup (1986–present)

Children's
 Little J & Big Cuz (2017–present on NITV, shared with ABC Kids)

Music
 Eurovision: Australia Decides (2019–2022)
 SBS PopAsia (2011–2013 on SBS, 2013–present on SBS VICELAND)

International

News
International news is broadcast on SBS networks throughout the morning, all recorded from the previous day’s broadcast.

Variety
 Vs. Arashi

Comedy
 Atlanta (USA; SBS VICELAND)
 Brooklyn Nine-Nine (US; SBS VICELAND)
 Fargo (US; SBS VICELAND)
 Letterkenny (Canada; SBS VICELAND)
 The Orville (USA; SBS VICELAND)

Game Shows
 Jeopardy! (USA; SBS, SBS VICELAND)

Drama
 The Good Fight (US)
 Gomorrah (Italy)
 The Handmaid's Tale (TV series) (US)
 Hard Rock Medical (Canada)
Inspector Montalbano (Italy)
 Inspector Rex (Austria, Italy)
 Lost Girl (Canada)
 Luther (US)
 Trickster (Canada; NITV)
 War of the Worlds (US, France)
 World on Fire (UK)

Soap Opera
 Shortland Street (NZ)

Annual Events
 Eurovision Song Contest (1983–present)

Upcoming series

2022
 Barrumbi Kids (children's)

2023
Upcoming series:
 Adam and Poh's Great Australian Bites (lifestyle)
 Alone Australia (reality)
 Asking for It (doco)
 Barossa Gourmet with Justine Schofield (lifestyle)
 The Big Fat Quiz of Sport (game show)
 The Big School Swap (doco)
 The Chocolate Queen (lifestyle)
 Erotic Stories (drama)
 The First Inventors (doco)
 Great Australian Walks with Julia Zemiro (factual/doco)
 Inside Sydney Airport (doco)
 Khanh Ong's Wild Food (lifestyle)
 Luke Nguyen's Indian Insights (lifestyle)
 The Matchmakers (doco)
 Paradise Kitchen Bali with Lauren Camilleri (lifestyle)
 Safe Home (drama)
 While the Men Are Away (drama)
 Who The Bloody Hell Are We? (factual/doco)

Former programming

Domestic

News and current affairs
 Hotline (1990–2007)
 Global Village (1998-2015)
 Mandarin News Australia (2010–2012 on SBS2)
 Toyota World Sport (2005–2006)

Drama
 Better Man (2013)
 Carla Cametti PD (2009)
 Chainsaw (2009)
 The Circuit (2007–2009)
 Creamerie (2021–present)
 Dead Lucky (2018)
 Deep Water (2016)
 East West 101 (2007–2011)
 The Girl from Steel City (1986)
 Going Home (2000–2001)
 Hungry Ghosts (2020)
 In Between (1987)
 The Liberation of Skopje (1981)
 On the Ropes (2018)
 One of the Lucky Ones (2009)
 The Principal (2015)
 RAN (Remote Area Nurse) (2006)
 Safe Harbour (2018)
 Saved (2009)
 Sunshine (2017)
 The Three Sea-Wolves (1980)
 The Tourist (1987)
 Tudawali (1988)
 Under the Skin (1993)
 Women of the Sun (1981)

Comedy
 The Back Side of Television (2021)
 Bogan Pride (2008)
 Danger 5 (2012–2015)
 Dave in the Life (2009–2010)
 Effie, Just Quietly (2001)
 The Family Law (2016–2019)
 House Gang (1996)
 Housos (2011–2013)
 John Safran vs God (2004)
 John Safran's Music Jamboree (2002)
 Kick (2007)
 Legally Brown (2013-2014)
 Life Support (2004)
 Marx and Venus (2007)
 Newstopia (2007–2008)
 Pizza (2000–2007)
 Quads! (2001-2002, co-produced with Nelvana)
 Speaking in Tongues (2005–2006)
 Swift and Shift Couriers (2008–2011)
 Wilfred (2007–2009)

Variety / entertainment
 In Siberia Tonight (2005-2006)
 Room 101 (2015)
 Salam Cafe (2008)

Reality
 The Chefs' Line (2017–2018)
 Child Genius (2018–2019)
 The Colony (2005)
 Eco House Challenge (2007)
 The Family (2011–2012)
 Living With The Enemy (2014)
 Look Me in the Eye (2017)
 Nerds FC (2006–2007)
 The Nest (2008-2009)
 Top Gear Australia (2008–2010, later moved to Nine)
 Undressed (2017)

Lifestyle
 Adam Liaw's Road Trip for Good (2020)
 Andy & Ben Eat Australia (2017 on Food Network)
 Born to Cook: Jack Stein Downunder (2017)
 Cook Like an Italian with Silvia Colloca (2019)
 Costa's Garden Odyssey (2009–2011)
 Fashionista (2003–2005)
 Food Lovers' Guide to Australia (1996–2006)
 A Girl's Guide to Hunting, Fishing and Wild Cooking (2021)
 Hipsters (2015)
 Inside Heston's World (2016)
 Is Your House Killing You? (2007)
 Lonely Planet Six Degrees 
 Luke Nguyen's Vietnam (2009–2011)
 Lyndey and Blair's Taste of Greece (2011)
 My Family Feast (2009-2010)
 On Country Kitchen (2017)
 Peter Kuruvita's Coastal Kitchen (2016, 2018)
 Poh & Co. (2015–2016)
 Taste Le Tour (2004–2019)
 The Movie Show (1986–2006)
 Vasili's Garden (2007)
 Zumbo (2011)

Game shows
 ADbc (2009)
 HotSpell (2007)
 Letters and Numbers (2011-2013)
 The Squiz (2009)
 Visquiz (1985)

Documentaries
 A Pang for Brasil (2014)
 Addicted Australia (2020)
 Australia Come Fly with Me (2020)
 Australia vs Anxiety (2021)
 Birdsville or Bust (2020)
 The Bowraville Murders (2021)
 The Beach (2020)
 The Children in the Pictures (2021)
 Could You Survive on the Breadline? (2021)
 Decadence (2006–2007)
 Filthy Rich and Homeless (2017–2018, 2020)
 First Australians (2008)
 First Contact (2014, 2016)
 Framed (2021)
 Go Back to Where You Came From (2011-2012, 2015, 2018)
 Help (2006)
 Incarceration Nation (2021)
 Indian Wedding Race (2016)
 Inside Australia (2003–2009)
 Is Australia Racist? (2016)
 Is Australia Sexist? (2016)
 Life on the Outside (2022)
 My Space is an Amazing Place
 Osher Günsberg: A Matter of Life and Death (2021)
 Our African Roots (2021)
 Parent Rescue (2007)
 Podlove (2007)
 Sandman in Siberia (2005)
 Secret Life of Death (2018)
 Secrets of Our Cities (2017, 2020)
 See What You Made Me Do (2021)
 Shaun Micallef's Stairway to Heaven (2015, 2017)
 Storyline Australia (2004–2007)
 Strong Female Lead (2021)
 Strictly Jewish (2016)
 Struggle Street (2015, 2017)
 Testing Teachers (2017)
 This Is Brazil! (2014)
 Two of Us (2006)
 Who Gets to Stay in Australia? (2019)
 Wild Things (2021)
 World Tales

Children's programs
 Captain Socceroo
 Kaleidoscope (1986-1992)
 Tiny Toon Adventures
 Thalu (2020 on NITV, shared with ABC Me)

Sports
Basketball: NBL (2016–2017, 2019–2021)
Soccer: A-League (2013-2017, on SBS and SBS2), W-League (2017–2020)
Tennis: US Open (2017–2021)

Sports talk
 The Full Brazilian (2014)
 League Nation Live (2016 on NITV)
 Santo, Sam and Ed's Cup Fever! (2010)
 Thursday FC (SBS 2 2013–2014)
 Under the Grandstand (2005)

Music
 RocKwiz (2005–2016)
 So Frenchy, So Chic (2005)

Special events
 Oz Concert
 Sydney Gay and Lesbian Mardi Gras (2014–2021)

International

News
International news was broadcast on SBS networks throughout the morning, all recorded from the previous day’s broadcast.

Animation
 Angry Kid (UK)
 Animal Farm (UK, originally aired on ABC)
 Aqua Teen Hunger Force (US, Now on 9Go!)
 bro'Town (NZ)
 Drawn Together (US)
 Happy Tree Friends (US)
 Harvey Birdman, Attorney at Law (US, Now on 9Go!)
 Night Sweats (Canada, Shared with 10 Shake on November 7, 2020 to September 26, 2021)
 The Ricky Gervais Show (UK)
 Robot Chicken (US, Now on 9Go!)
 Robin (Sweden)
 Stripperella (US)
 South Park (US; 1997–2013 on SBS, 2013–2021 on SBS VICELAND; Shared with 10 Shake)
 Ugly Americans (US)

Anime
 Attack on Titan 
 Bleach
 Bubblegum Crisis Tokyo 2040
 Ghost in the Shell: Stand Alone Complex
 Gunsmith Cats
 Neon Genesis Evangelion
 Samurai Champloo
 Assassination Classroom 
 Space Dandy

Drama
 The Awakening (Singapore)
 Big Love (US)
 Brookside (UK)
 Butterfly (UK)
 Chateauvallon (France)
 Chimerica (UK)
 Comrades (Greece)
 Conquest of the Sky (France)
 Coronation Street (UK)
 Dance with Me (Brazil)
 Den of Wolves (Mexico)
 Derrick (Germany)
 The Devil's Games (Italy)
 Drunken City (Greece)
 Dublin Murders (Ireland)
 Empress Wu (Hong Kong)
 Entourage (US)
 Flight of Eagles (Turkey)
 Funland (UK)
 A Glass Full of Snow (Italy)
 Half Time (Germany)
 Heart (Italy)
 Heimat (Germany)
 Homeland (US)
 Italian Stories (Italy)
 Joys and Shadows (Spain)
 Knightfall (US, Czech Republic)
 The Little Drummer Girl (UK)
 Little Missy (Brazil)
 Mika (Sweden)
 Mino (Germany)
 The Name of the Rose (Italy)
 The New Pope (Italy, France, Spain)
 Oshin (Japan)
 Oz (US) (2004-2007)
 Police Station (France)
 Project Blue Book (US)
 Queer as Folk (Canada, US)
 The Return of the Written Off (Yugoslavia)
 The Salisbury Poisonings (UK)
 Shrewd Juanita (Spain)
 Spring (Brazil)
 Trust Me (UK)
 Unit One (Denmark)
 The Victim (UK)
 Vikings (Canada, Ireland)
 We Are Who We Are (US, Italy)
 Years and Years (UK)
 ZeroZeroZero (Italy)

Comedy
 30 Rock (US, SBS 2)
 Aaagh! It's the Mr. Hell Show! (UK, Canada)
 Angry Kid (UK)
 Baddiel and Skinner Unplanned (UK)
 Broad City (US)
 Brooklyn Nine-Nine (SBS 2)
 Chappelle's Show (US, now airs on 7mate)
 Community (US, SBS 2)
 Corner Gas (Canada)
 Crank Yankers (US)
 Dadı (Turkey, 1984)
 Difficult People (US)
 Dr. Katz, Professional Therapist (US)
 Drop the Dead Donkey (UK)
 Drunk History (US)
 Entourage (US)
 The Fast Show (UK)
 Full Frontal with Samantha Bee (USA)
 Funland (UK)
 Garth Marenghi's Darkplace (UK)
 Gerhard Reinke's Wanderlust (US)
 Have I Got News for You (UK)
 KYTV (UK)
 The Lenny Henry Show (UK)
 Mystery Science Theater 3000 (US)
 Nathan for You (US)
 Nighty Night (UK)
 Non-Stop Nonsense (UK)
 Office Gossip (Germany)
 On Becoming a God in Central Florida (US)
 Pond Life (UK)
 The Red Green Show (Canada)
 Rex the Runt (UK, now airs on ABC2)
 Say Aah (Holland)
 Shameless (UK)
 Shrill (US)
 Skins (UK)
 Stella Street (UK)
 That Awful Mess (UK)
 Three Ladies and Their Hot Dog Stand (Germany)
 Under One Roof (Singapore)

Magic
 The Secret Cabaret (UK)

Lifestyle
 Delia Smith's Cookery Course (UK)
 Floyd on France (UK)
 Iron Chef (Japan; SBS2)

Factual
 MythBusters (new episodes, repeat episodes shared with 7mate)
 Greeks of the Sea, 19 July to 2 August 2014, the Greek's relationship with the sea
 Anatomy for Beginners (Germany)

Variety
 American Ninja Warrior (US, Now on 9Go!)
 Fantástico (Brazil)

Children's programs
 The Adventures of Chirpy the Sparrow (Poland)
 The Adventures of Colargol (France)
 The Adventures of Damian the Cat (UK, Czechoslovakia)
 Hergé's Adventures of Tintin (France, not to be confused with the early 90s series)
 Amigo and Friends (US, Mexico)
 Anna, Ciro and Co. (Italy)
 Apple Goes Rolling (Czechoslovakia)
 Arabela (Czechoslovakia)
 Balthazar the Centipede (France)
 Bamse (Sweden)
 Barbapapa (Netherlands)
 Bernard Bombus (Czechoslovakia)
 The Blackbird Brothers (Czechoslovakia)
 Bojan the Bear (Yugoslavia, sometimes shares with ABC)
 The Brotherhood of the Blue Seagull (Yugoslavia)
 The Bunny with the Chequered Ears (Hungary)
 Cantinflas (Mexico)
 The Clown and Valentina (Switzerland)
 The Cowherd's Flute (China)
 Creepy Crawlies (UK)
 Dali the Puppy Dog (Poland)
 Detectives on Holidays (Poland)
 Dog and Cat (Poland)
 Don Quixote (Netherlands)
 The Electric Company (US, originally aired on Network Ten and ABC)
 Emily (France)
 European Folk Tales (UK)
 Everybody Here (UK)
 Fairytales from the Woods (Czechoslovakia)
 Five Water Dragons (Czechoslovakia)
 Flic the Squirrel (Belgium)
 The Flute and the Bombardon (Netherlands)
 Foxy Fable (UK)
 Garden with Statues (Greece)
 Graine D'Ortie (France)
 Granny's Little Grandson (Serbia)
 Gus and Caestar (Poland)
 Gustavus (Hungary, originally aired on ABC)
 Hang in There, Floki (Yugoslavia)
 Huskies Never Freeze (Sweden)
 The Inspector's Kids (Italy)
 Johnny the Pea (Czechoslovakia)
 Karino (Poland)
 Kate and Skubanek (Czechoslovakia)
 Klimbo (Canada)
 Lardock and Crunch (Czechoslovakia)
 Legends of the World (Canada)
 Let's Laugh with the Colombaioni (Italy)
 Lilliput Put (Italy)
 The Little Poppy Man (Czechoslovakia)
 The Long White Trail (Czechoslovakia)
 The Magician's Boy (Sweden)
 Mandara (Germany)
 Marco Polo's Stone (Italy)
 Master Kristian (Czechoslovakia)
 Melita the Fibber (Yugoslavia)
 Mimosa (Finland)
 Mischief (Czechoslovakia)
 Mr. Hiccup (Italy)
 Mr. Storyteller (Greece)
 Mr. Tau (Czechoslovakia)
 The Mole (Czechoslovakia)
 The Morce Mystery (Italy)
 Murun Buchstansangur (UK)
 Muzzy in Gondoland (UK)
 My Friend Piki Jacob (Yugoslavia)
 The Mysterious Island (Czechoslovakia)
 Mystery of the Seventh Road (Netherlands)
 News from Uhlenbusch (Germany)
 No Talking About School (Czechoslovakia)
 Noah and Nelly in... SkylArk (UK, originally aired on ABC)
 Once Upon a Time... Life (France)
 Once Upon a Time... Man (France)
 Once Upon a Time... Space (France)
 Only Kaska (Poland)
 Open Book (Canada)
 Pinocchio (Italy)
 Pulcinella (Italy)
 The Rambles of Chubby Dumpling (Poland)
 Ravioli (Germany)
 Rosalie (Poland)
 Safari (Czechoslovakia)
 Sammy the Squirrel (Hungary)
 Seabert (Belgium)
 The Secret of the Old Attic (Hungary)
 Shakespeare: The Animated Tales (UK)
 She Came Out of the Blue Sky (Czechoslovakia)
 The Sprite and the Owl (Czechoslovakia)
 Stories from Honey (UK)
 Storybook International (UK)
 Storytime (Sweden)
 Stripy (Switzerland)
 Tails the Terror of Cats (Hungary)
 Thomas and Senior (Netherlands)
 Tik Tak (Belgium)
 Tjorven and Skrallan (Sweden)
 Treasure in Malta (Malta)
 Vagabul (France)
 Vayia's Treasure (Greece)
 Victor & Maria (UK)
 Water Spider (Hungary)
 The White Stone (Sweden)
 The Woman Who Raised a Bear as Her Son (Canada, later aired on ABC)
 The World's Most Beautiful Tales (Switzerland)
 Xerxes (Sweden)
 The Yellow Woodpecker's Ranch (Brazil)
 Zipstones (Netherlands)
 Zoom the White Dolphin (France, originally aired on ABC)

Sports 
Licensed from beIN Sports:

 Soccer: UEFA Europa League (2009–2014), UEFA Champions League (1980–2018)
 Tennis: French Open (2018–2020)

Licensed from Optus Sport:

 Soccer: English Premier League (1993-2004, 2016–2019)

See also

 List of programs broadcast by ABC Television
 List of programs broadcast by Network 10
 List of programs broadcast by Nine Network
 List of programs broadcast by Seven Network
 List of Australian television series

Notes

References

External links

SBS programs
 
Special Broadcasting Service